The 1981 NCAA Division I Basketball Championship Game took place on March 30, 1981 between the North Carolina Tar Heels and Indiana Hoosiers at The Spectrum in Philadelphia. The matchup was the final one of the forty-third consecutive NCAA Men's Division I Basketball Championship single-elimination tournament — commonly referred to as the NCAA Tournament — organized by the National Collegiate Athletic Association (NCAA) and is used to crown a national champion for men's basketball at the Division I level.

Because of the assassination attempt on President Ronald Reagan by John Hinckley, there was talk of postponing or cancelling the title game; but once NCAA officials learned that Reagan had made it through surgery and would survive his injuries, the game was played as scheduled.  Howard Cosell criticized the NCAA for not postponing the game due to the Reagan assassination attempt.

The 1980–81 season was the last before the NCAA began sponsoring a championship for Division I women's basketball. All future NCAA men's tournaments and championship games would include "Men's" in their official titles.

Participants
It was the first national championship game between the schools. Indiana was seeking its fourth NCAA Tournament championship (1940, 1953, 1976) while North Carolina won the NCAA Tournament in 1957.

Indiana

North Carolina

Starting lineups

Game summary

Source:

References

Citations

Bibliography

NCAA Division I Basketball Championship Game
NCAA Division I Men's Basketball Championship Games
Indiana Hoosiers men's basketball
North Carolina Tar Heels men's basketball
College basketball tournaments in Pennsylvania
Basketball competitions in Philadelphia
NCAA Division I Basketball Championship Game
NCAA Division I Basketball Championship Game, 1981
NCAA Division I Basketball Championship Game
NCAA Division I Basketball Championship Game